The 2017 Cheltenham Gold Cup (known as the Timico Gold Cup for sponsorship reasons) was the 89th annual running of the Cheltenham Gold Cup horse race and was held at Cheltenham Racecourse on Friday 17 March 2017. It was won by Sizing John, ridden by Robbie Power and trained by Jessica Harrington. It was the first time that Robbie Power had ridden in the race and also the first time Jessica Harrington had an entry in the race.

Details
 Sponsor: Timico
 Winner's prize money: £327,462
 Going: Good
 Number of runners: 13 
 Winner's time: 6m 36.30s

Result

* The distances between the horses are shown in lengths or shorter. s.h. = short-head. nk = neck. † Trainers are based in Great Britain unless indicated. PU = pulled-up. F = fell. UR = unseated rider

References 

Cheltenham Gold Cup
 2017
Cheltenham Gold Cup
2010s in Gloucestershire
March 2017 sports events in the United Kingdom